Wolf 359 is a red dwarf star located in the constellation Leo, near the ecliptic. At a distance of approximately 7.9 light years from Earth, it has an apparent magnitude of 13.54 and can only be seen with a large telescope. Wolf 359 is one of the nearest stars to the Sun; only the Alpha Centauri system (including Proxima Centauri), Barnard's Star, and the brown dwarfs Luhman 16 (WISE 1049-5319) and WISE 0855−0714 are known to be closer. Its proximity to Earth has led to its mention in several works of fiction.

Wolf 359 is one of the faintest and lowest-mass stars known. At the light-emitting layer called the photosphere, it has a temperature of about 2,800 K, which is low enough for chemical compounds to form and survive. The absorption lines of compounds such as water and titanium(II) oxide have been observed in the spectrum. The surface has a magnetic field that is stronger than the average magnetic field on the Sun. As a result of magnetic activity caused by convection, Wolf 359 is a flare star that can undergo sudden increases in luminosity for several minutes. These flares emit strong bursts of X-ray and gamma ray radiation that have been observed by space telescopes. Wolf 359 is a relatively young star with an age of less than a billion years. One planetary companion is suspected, with another candidate planet having been found to be a likely false positive, but as yet no debris disks have been found.

Observation history and name
Wolf 359 first came to the attention of astronomers because of the relatively high rate of transverse motion against the background, known as the proper motion. A high rate of proper motion can indicate that a star is located nearby, as more distant stars must move at higher velocities in order to achieve the same rate of angular travel across the celestial sphere. The proper motion of Wolf 359 was first measured in 1917 by German astronomer Max Wolf, with the aid of astrophotography. In 1919 he published a catalog of over one thousand stars with high proper motions, including this one, that are still identified by his name. He listed this star as entry number 359, and the star has since been referred to as Wolf 359 in reference to Max Wolf's catalogue.

From this position change, and the known size of the Earth's orbit, the distance to the star could be estimated. It was the lowest-mass and faintest star known until the discovery of VB 10 in 1944. The infrared magnitude of the star was measured in 1957. In 1969, a brief flare in the luminosity of Wolf 359 was observed, linking it to the class of variable stars known as flare stars.

Properties
Wolf 359 has a stellar classification of M6, although various sources list a spectral class of M5.5, M6.5 or M8. Most M-type stars are red dwarfs: they are called red because the energy emission of the star reaches a peak in the red and infrared parts of the spectrum. Wolf 359 has a very low luminosity, emitting about 0.1% of the Sun's energy. If it were moved to the location of the Sun, it would appear ten times as bright as the full Moon.

At an estimated 11% of the Sun's mass, Wolf 359 is just above the lowest limit at which a star can perform hydrogen fusion through the proton–proton chain reaction: 8% of the Sun's mass. (Substellar objects below this limit are known as brown dwarfs.)

The entire star is undergoing convection, whereby the energy generated at the core is being transported toward the surface by the convective motion of plasma, rather than by transmission through radiation. This circulation redistributes any accumulation of helium that is generated through stellar nucleosynthesis at the core throughout the star. This process will allow the star to remain on the main sequence as a hydrogen fusing star proportionately longer than a star such as the Sun where helium steadily accumulates at the core. In combination with a lower rate of hydrogen consumption due to its low mass, the convection will allow Wolf 359 to remain a main-sequence star for about eight trillion years.

A search of this star by the Hubble Space Telescope revealed no stellar companions. No excess infrared emission has been detected, which may indicate the lack of a debris disk in orbit around it. Radial velocity measurements of this star using the Near Infrared Spectrometer (NIRSPEC) instrument at the Keck II observatory have not revealed any variations that might otherwise indicate the presence of an orbiting companion. This instrumentation is sensitive enough to detect the gravitational perturbations of massive, short period companions with the mass of Neptune or greater.

Outer atmosphere
The outer, light-emitting layer of a star is known as the photosphere. Temperature estimates of the photosphere of Wolf 359 range from 2,500 K to 2,900 K, which is sufficiently cool for equilibrium chemistry to occur. The resulting chemical compounds survive long enough to be observed through their spectral lines. Numerous molecular bands appear in the spectrum of Wolf 359, including those of carbon monoxide (CO), iron hydride (FeH), chromium hydride (CrH), water (H2O), magnesium hydride (MgH), vanadium(II) oxide (VO), titanium(II) oxide (TiO) and possibly the molecule CaOH. Since there are no lines of lithium in the spectrum, this element must have already been consumed by fusion at the core. This indicates the star must be at least 100 million years old.

Beyond the photosphere lies a nebulous, high temperature region known as the stellar corona. In 2001, Wolf 359 became the first star other than the Sun to have the spectrum of its corona observed from a ground-based telescope. The spectrum showed emission lines of Fe XIII, which is heavily ionized iron that has been stripped of twelve of its electrons. The strength of this line can vary over a time period of several hours, which may be evidence of microflare heating.

Wolf 359 is classified as a UV Ceti-type flare star, which is a star that undergoes brief, energetic increases in luminosity because of magnetic activity in the photosphere.  Its variable star designation is CN Leonis.  Wolf 359 has a relatively high flare rate.  Observations with the Hubble Space Telescope detected 32 flare events within a two-hour period, with energies of 1027 ergs (1020 joules) and higher. The mean magnetic field at the surface of Wolf 359 has a strength of about 2.2 kG (0.22 teslas), but this varies significantly on time scales as short as six hours. By comparison, the magnetic field of the Sun averages 1 gauss (100 μT), although it can rise as high as 3 kG (0.3 T) in active sunspot regions. During flare activity, Wolf 359 has been observed emitting X-rays and gamma rays.

Motion

The rotation of a star causes a Doppler shift to the spectrum. On average, this results in a broadening of the absorption lines in its spectrum, with the lines increasing in width with higher rates of rotation. However, only the rotational motion in the direction of the observer can be measured by this means, so the resulting data provides a lower limit on the star's rotation. This projected rotational velocity of Wolf 359's equator is less than 3 km/s, which is below the threshold of detection through spectral line broadening. This low rate of rotation may have been caused by loss of angular momentum through a stellar wind. Typically, the time scale for the spin down of a star at spectral class M6 is roughly 10 billion years, because fully convective stars like this lose their rotation more slowly than other stars. However, evolutionary models suggest that Wolf 359 is a relatively young star with an age of less than a billion years.

The proper motion Wolf 359 against the background is 4.696 arcseconds per year, and it is moving away from the Sun at a velocity of 19 km/s. When translated into the galactic coordinate system, this motion corresponds to a space velocity of  = . The space velocity of Wolf 359 implies that it belongs to the population of old-disk stars.

Planetary system

In June of 2019, an international team of astronomers led by Mikko Tuomi from the University of Hertfordshire, UK, submitted a preprint with the results of the first reported detection of two candidate exoplanets orbiting Wolf 359 using the radial velocity method from observations with HARPS in Chile and HIRES in Hawaii. If these planets are confirmed, the setup of the system would be similar to but more extreme than that of nearby red dwarf Proxima Centauri, both having a close-in low-mass planet and a farther out higher-mass planet. The inner planet, Wolf 359c, would receive about three times more stellar radiation than Earth does, making it very unlikely to be a habitable planet.

Further observations from the CARMENES survey have found that the radial velocity signal corresponding to the inner planet candidate c is likely to be a false positive, with a stellar rather than planetary origin.

See also

 List of brown dwarfs
 List of nearest stars and brown dwarfs
 Wolf 359 in fiction

References

External links

 The Encyclopedia of Astrobiology, Astronomy, and Spaceflight
 
  Table with parallaxes.
 

Leo (constellation)
Local Bubble
M-type main-sequence stars
Flare stars
Leonis, CN
0359
0406
Hypothetical planetary systems
TIC objects